Un autre univers is the sixth studio album, and first entirely French language release, by Australian singer Tina Arena, released on 6 December 2005. It reached number 9 in the French chart in November 2006, its highest position since entering the chart almost a year earlier. The album was certified platinum in France.

The album blends acoustic guitars, eastern strings and driving rhythms. The 13-track album includes a duet with the French singer Henri Salvador, "Et Puis Après". Although never released as a single, the song was included on two subsequent records : the French compilation The Best & le meilleur and the concept record Songs of Love & Loss. The track was one of the veteran French singer's final recordings, becoming a standout cut from the album due to the high profile of the collaboration.

The title track is a French language re-working of "Woman" from previous studio album, Just Me. The title translates into English as "another universe".

Lead single "Aimer jusqu'à l'impossible" was her biggest French hit to date after debuting at number 3 on the French national charts in November 2005 and remaining in the top 5 for over 10 weeks. In February 2006 the single achieved platinum sales in France. A second single "Je m'appelle Bagdad" was released in May and a third "Tu aurais dû me dire (Oser parler d'amour)" in October 2006.

Chart performance
The album peaked at number 9 on the French Albums Chart for one week, staying in the top 100 for sixty-two weeks and spending a total of seventy-eight weeks in the top 200. The album became the 127th highest selling album in France for 2005 and the 38th for 2006.

In Belgium, it entered the Belgian (Wallonia) Albums Chart at number 70 on 17 December 2005, then successfully moved to its peak position of #24 on 29 July 2006, the album spent a total of fifty-three weeks in the top 100.

In Switzerland, the album debuted at number 83 and peaked at 69, spending eight weeks in the top 100.

Track listing

Charts

Weekly charts

Year-end charts

Certifications

Release history

References

External links

2005 albums
Tina Arena albums
Columbia Records albums